Qarah Kahriz Rural District is a rural district (dehestan) in Qarah Kahriz District, Shazand County, Markazi Province, Iran. At the 2006 census, its population (including Bazneh, which was subsequently detached from the rural district and promoted to city status) was 25,040, in 6,627 families; excluding Bazneh, the population (as of 2006) was 21,140, in 5,639 families. The rural district has 27 villages.

References 

Rural Districts of Markazi Province
Shazand County